Azaad may refer to:

 Azaad (1955 film)
 Azaad (1978 film)
 Azaad TV, Hindi general entertainment channel

See also
 Azad (disambiguation)